Germain Anouman Ollo (10 May 1951 – 28 December 2022) was an Ivorian businessman and politician.

Biography
In 1975, Ollo earned a degree in civil engineering and became technical director of SOPIM. In this position, he unsuccessfully sought to build the first hotel in Grand-Bassam. As CEO of the SITHO group, he campaigned for the creation of a police force and a bank specializing in tourism. He also served as president of the Association nationale des consultants ivoiriens and executive vice-president of the Fédération des consultants africains.

In 2018, as a member of the Rally of Houphouëtists for Democracy and Peace, Ollo became Vice-President of the Senate. In the Senate, he represented the Sud-Comoé region.

Ollo died in Istanbul on 28 December 2022, at the age of 71.

References

1951 births
2022 deaths
Ivorian politicians
Political office-holders in Ivory Coast
People from Grand-Bassam